"Podunk" is a song co-written and recorded by American country music artist Keith Anderson.  It was released in September 2006 as the fifth and final single from his debut album Three Chord Country and American Rock & Roll.  The song reached number 34 on the US Billboard Hot Country Songs chart. Anderson wrote this song with Jeffrey Steele and Tom Hambridge.

Chart performance

References

2006 singles
2005 songs
Keith Anderson songs
Songs written by Keith Anderson
Songs written by Tom Hambridge
Songs written by Jeffrey Steele
Arista Nashville singles